The 1969 Calgary Stampeders finished in 2nd place in the Western Conference with a 9–7 record. They appeared in the Western Semi-Final where they lost to the Saskatchewan Roughriders.

Regular season

Season Standings

Season schedule

Playoffs

West Semi-Final

West Final

 Saskatchewan wins the best of three series 2–0. The Roughriders will advance to the Grey Cup Championship game.

Awards and records

1969 CFL All-Stars
TE – Herman Harrison, CFL All-Star

References

Calgary Stampeders seasons
1969 Canadian Football League season by team